Covenant Worship is an American Christian music worship band from Dallas, Texas. Their group formed at Covenant Church, an interdenominational congregation, while the church was established by Pastors Mike and Kathy Hayes, in 1976. The group released, Heaven on Earth in 2009 and Never Going Back in 2010, independently. They have released 4 live albums, Standing in 2012,  Kingdom in 2014, Take Heart in 2016 and Sand and Stars in 2017.  In May 2017, after the release of Sand and Stars, worship pastors David and Nicole Binion (Along With Daughter Madison "Gracie" Binion or MDSN) felt the urging from God that their time with covenant was coming to an end. Since then Covenant Worship has released 2 live albums, 1 studio albums(with Covenant Church youth worship group Cov Kid), and 1 instrumental album.

Background
Covenant Worship is from Dallas, Texas, where they were established in 2009, with four members, David Binion, Nicole Binion, Joshua Dufrene, and Colin Edge, while they are members of Covenant Church, an interdenominational congregation, founded by Pastors Mike and Kathy Hayes, in 1976.

Music history
The band started as a musical entity in 2009, with their first independently-made album, Heaven on Earth, that was released on October 27, 2009, from Covenant Worship. This album was their breakthrough release upon the Billboard magazine charts, where it peaked at No. 29 on the Gospel Albums chart. Their subsequent album, a studio album, Standing, was released on August 7, 2012, by Integrity Music. The album charted on three Billboard magazine charts, where it peaked at No. 138 on The Billboard 200, No. 2 on Christian Albums, and No. 19 on the Independent Albums chart. They released, Kingdom, on July 1, 2014, with Integrity Media. This album peaked on The Billboard 200 at No. 113, and at No. 2 on the Christian Albums chart. They released, Take Heart, on February 26, 2016, with Integrity Music.

Members
Current members
 Joshua Jachin Dufrene (August 13, 1986)
 Colin Geoffrey Edge (January 4, 1990)
Nathan Walker
Former Members

 David Lee Binion (November 7, 1962)
 Nicole Denise Binion (April 18, 1975, née, Power)
Madison Grace Binion

Discography
Live albums

References

External links
Official website

Musical groups from Texas
2009 establishments in Texas
Musical groups established in 2009